Ivan Pešić (born 6 April 1992) is a Croatian footballer who plays as a left winger for Alashkert.

Club career
Pešić started his youth career in NK Oluja, the club from his native village of Čista Velika. At the age of 12, he moved to the seaside NK Vodice for two seasons before moving on to the HNK Hajduk Split youth setup. A youth U-19 international, he remained at the club in his first senior year, but featured only in friendlies and a single Croatian Football Cup match, against Jadran Gunja. Released at the end of the season, he moved to Austria Klagenfurt, but after a single youth team and state cup match, he returned to Croatia, this time to HNK Šibenik in the Druga HNL.

Pešić's fledgling career was brought to a temporary halt by a traffic accident. After only 9 matches in the year and a half at Šibenik, Pešić had moved on to the Prva HNL team NK Zadar in early 2014. However, due to inflammation of his pubic bone, Pešić played in only 2 matches until the end of the season.

However, Pešić became a first-team regular the following (2014/15) season, under coach Miroslav Blažević. He would go on to amass four goals and eight assists from his preferred left wing position. This resulted in his transfer to RNK Split, having earned the reputation as one of the quickest players in the league.

After his club's relegation in the summer of 2017, Pešić rejoined HNK Hajduk Split.

In 2018, he joined Romanian club Dinamo București. He was loaned out at Shakhter Karagandy in 2019 and released by Dinamo in January 2020, after his return from Shakhter.

On 15 February 2020, Pešić signed for FC Kaisar.

On 20 February 2023, Pešić signed for FC Alashkert.

References

External links
 
 Ivan Pešić at rnksplit.hr

1992 births
Living people
Sportspeople from Šibenik
Association football wingers
Croatian footballers
Croatia youth international footballers
HNK Hajduk Split players
SK Austria Klagenfurt players
HNK Šibenik players
NK Zadar players
RNK Split players
FC Dinamo București players
FC Shakhter Karagandy players
FC Kaisar players
FC Vorskla Poltava players
FC Voluntari players
FC Dinamo Minsk players
FC Caspiy players
FC Alashkert players
First Football League (Croatia) players
Croatian Football League players
Liga I players
Kazakhstan Premier League players
Ukrainian Premier League players
Belarusian Premier League players
Croatian expatriate footballers
Croatian expatriate sportspeople in Austria
Expatriate footballers in Austria
Croatian expatriate sportspeople in Romania
Expatriate footballers in Romania
Croatian expatriate sportspeople in Kazakhstan
Expatriate footballers in Kazakhstan
Croatian expatriate sportspeople in Ukraine
Expatriate footballers in Ukraine
Croatian expatriate sportspeople in Belarus
Expatriate footballers in Belarus
Expatriate footballers in Armenia